Danny Pieters (born 13 October 1956) is a Belgian politician and judge.

Pieters was first elected to the Belgian Chamber of Representatives in 1999 as a member of the Volksunie and served until 2003. After the demise of that party he became affiliated to the N-VA. He was elected as a member of the Belgian Senate in 2010. He was the 33rd President of the Belgian Senate from July 2010 until October 2011.

He obtained a doctorate in law in 1985 and is currently a professor of social security law at the KU Leuven.

In 2021 Pieters was appointed as a member of the Constitutional Court of Belgium.

Notes

1956 births
Living people
Members of the Senate (Belgium)
New Flemish Alliance politicians
People from Uccle
Presidents of the Senate (Belgium)
Vice-presidents of the Senate (Belgium)
21st-century Belgian politicians
Academic staff of KU Leuven